Badger, Manitoba is a hamlet in the Rural Municipality of Piney, Manitoba.

It known for its blueberry crop.

History 
Badger began  in 1900 as a railway station along the Manitoba and Southern Railway. In its early days, the community had three grocery stores, a post office (opened in 1904; closed in 1961), a dance hall, school house, section and station houses.

The community was known to the Canadian National Railway as Summit for their railway point on section 12-3-11E; the school district, called Evergreen, was located on 6-3-12E.

References 

 Geographical Names of Manitoba - Badger (pg. 16) : published by Conservation Manitoba 2008

Unincorporated communities in Eastman Region, Manitoba
Hamlets in Manitoba